Stade Wobi Bobo-Dioulasso is a multi-use stadium in Bobo-Dioulasso, Burkina Faso.  It is currently used mostly for football matches and is the home stadium of Union Sportive du Foyer de la Régie Abidjan-Niger.  The stadium holds 10,000 people.

Wobi Bobo